The 1952 Nippon Professional Baseball season was the third season of operation of Nippon Professional Baseball (NPB).

Regular season

Standings

Postseason

Pacific League
For the first time, the Pacific League implemented a type of end-of-season playoff system. After the 108-game regular season, the four teams with the best winning percentages played an extra twelve regular season games to determine the league's champion. After the 108th game, the standings were:

The four qualifying teams were the Nankai Hawks, the Mainichi Orions, the Nishitetsu Lions, and the Daiei Stars. These four teams proceeded to play in a twelve game "round-robin" stage, with three games versus each opponent, in late September and early October. The results of this stage were:

The Mainichi Orions' won ten of the twelve extra games, which put them into a tie for the first place with the Nankai Hawks. Both teams had 75 wins, however the Hawks had one less loss than the Orions because of a game against the Daiei Stars that ended in a tie earlier in the season. Because of the impact the tie had on the pennant race, the Hawks and the Stars played an extra 121st game. The Hawks won the game, giving them sole claim to Pacific League title. After the season, this faux playoff system was scrapped because of criticism that it was unfair to the three non-qualifying teams that had their seasons truncated.

Japan Series

League leaders

Central League

Pacific League

Awards
Most Valuable Player
Takehiko Bessho, Yomiuri Giants (CL)
Susumu Yuki, Nankai Hawks (PL)
Rookie of the Year
Takao Sato, Kokutetsu Swallows (CL)
Futoshi Nakanishi, Nishitetsu Lions (PL)
Eiji Sawamura Award
Shigeru Sugishita, Nagoya Dragons (CL)

See also
1952 All-American Girls Professional Baseball League season
1952 Major League Baseball season

References